The Children of Bullerbyn Village is a 1960 TV film re-edited from the 1960 Swedish TV series of the same name and directed by Olle Hellbom. It was entered into the 2nd Moscow International Film Festival.

Cast
 Kaj Andersson as Bosse
 Tove Hellbom as Kerstin
 Jan Erik Husbom as Olle
 Tomas Johansson as Lasse
 Elisabeth Nordkvist as Anna
 Lena Wixell as Lisa
 Kim Åsberg as Britta

References

External links
 
 

1960 films
1960 drama films
Swedish drama films
1960s Swedish-language films
Swedish children's films
1960s Swedish films